The  was a DC electric multiple unit (EMU) train type which was operated on local services in Japan by Japanese National Railways (JNR) and later by Central Japan Railway Company (JR Central) between 1983 and March 2012.

Design
The 119 series design was based on the earlier 105 series EMU type, with improvements to cope with the steep gradients and winter climate of the Iida Line.

Variants
 119-0 series (Eight two-car sets, E10–17)
 119-100 series (single-car sets converted by adding a second driving cab)
 119-5000 series (Nine two-car sets, E1–9, converted by adding inverter air-conditioning)
 119-5100 series (Nine single-car sets, M1–9, converted from 119-100 series sets by adding inverter air-conditioning)
 119-5300 series (Eight two-car sets, R1–8, converted from 119-5000 series sets for wanman driver-only operation)

Formations
The sets were formed as follows.

119-0 series 2-car sets E10–17

The KuMoHa 119 car was fitted with one lozenge-type pantograph.

119-100 series single-car sets M1–9

Each car was fitted with one lozenge-type pantograph.

119-5000 series 2-car sets E1–9

The KuMoHa 119 car was fitted with one lozenge-type pantograph.

119-5100 series single-car sets M1–9

Each car was fitted with one lozenge-type pantograph.

119-5300 series 2-car sets R1–8

The KuMoHa 119 car was fitted with one lozenge-type pantograph.

Interior
Passenger accommodation consisted of a mixture of longitudinal bench seating and transverse four-seat bays. The KuHa 118 cars were equipped with a toilet.

Livery variations
Set E4 was repainted into its original JNR era livery in August 2009.

History

From 18 March 1983, all Iida Line services were made no-smoking.

From 3 March 2001, Iida Line services were switched to wanman driver-only operation.

The fleet was replaced by 213-5000 and 313-3000 series EMUs on the Iida Line, with the last train running on 31 March 2012.

Resale
Following withdrawal, six 2-car 119 series sets were sold to the third sector railway operator Echizen Railway in Fukui Prefecture, where they were converted to become Echizen Railway 7000 series EMUs, entering service from February 2013.

References

External links

Electric multiple units of Japan
Central Japan Railway Company
Train-related introductions in 1983
1500 V DC multiple units of Japan